Blindness is a visual condition.

Blindness may also refer to:

 Blindness (novel), a 1995 novel by Portuguese author José Saramago
 Blindness, a 1926 novel by English author Henry Green
 Blindness (2008 film), a 2008 film adaptation of the 1995 novel
 Blindness (2016 film), a 2016 Polish film
 "Blindness", a song by Metric from the 2009 album Fantasies
 Blindness Records

See also
 List of blindness effects
 Mind-blindness, a disability to be aware of mental states
 Willful blindness, a legal term for a deliberate attempt to avoid knowledge of illegal activities